Buckley Aircraft Company was an American aircraft manufacturer based in Wichita, Kansas.

Buckley aircraft was founded with US$150,000 in capital in 1929 by Fred Buckley, William J. Carr, Earl Jones, A.J Christman, Joseph Paul, and William Bushnell Stout.

The companies first product, the Buckley F-1 low winged monoplane with a Kinner K-5 engine was not considered a good design and was abandoned. The second product, the LC-4 was a modern all-aluminum four place aircraft that received orders for 200 units for air taxi service. The venture failed due to lack of capital as the Great Depression set in.

Aircraft

References

Defunct aircraft manufacturers of the United States